Mohamed Guilavogui (born 14 November 1996) is a Malian professional footballer who plays as a forward for French club GOAL.

Club career
A product of the youth system at Montpellier, Guilavogui made the move to Clermont in the summer of 2016. He made his senior debut with the club in a 1–1 Ligue 2 tie with Nîmes Olympique on 4 November 2016. In July 2017 he signed for Championnat National side Pau. In July 2019 he moved to fellow Championnat National side Villefranche.

In July 2022, Guilavogui joined fourth-tier Championnat National 2 club GOAL.

International career
Guilavogui made appearances for the Mali U20s at 2015 African U-20 Championship and the 2016 Toulon Tournament.

References

External links

1996 births
Living people
Sportspeople from Bamako
Malian footballers
Mali under-20 international footballers
French footballers
French sportspeople of Malian descent
Association football forwards
Expatriate footballers in France
Malian expatriate footballers
Malian expatriate sportspeople in France
Ligue 2 players
Championnat National players
Championnat National 2 players
Championnat National 3 players
Montpellier HSC players
Clermont Foot players
Pau FC players
FC Villefranche Beaujolais players
GOAL FC players